The first Venezuelan Chess Championship took place in February 1891 when Dr. Rafael Ruíz defeated Rafael Pittaluga in a match for the title (+7 =2 –4). In the second match, Rafael Ruíz drew with Carlos Perret Gentil (+7 =6 –7) in 1894.

Carlos Perret Gentil won the Venezuelan Championship in 1907, and defended the title until 1936, when he died. The first national championship organized by Federación Venezolana de Ajedrez (FVA) was held in 1938. Jaime Bograd (from Romania) won, ahead of Sady Loynaz Páez (from Venezuela), but the second one became a national Venezuelan Champion. He defended the title in matches against Dr. Manuel Acosta Silva (Caracas, 1939), José León García Díaz (Maracaibo, 1943), Omar Benítez (Caracas, 1944) and Héctor Estévez (Caracas, 1946). Sady Loynaz died in 1950, and Federación Venezolana de Ajedrez had organized two separate tournaments (Campeonato Nacional and Campeonato de Extranjeros for foreigners who resided in Venezuela) in Caracas in December 1950. The first tournament was won by Julio García, ahead of Irwin Perret Gentil, and the second one – Gerardo Budowski (from France), ahead of Andrés Sadde (from Latvia).

In 1951, Gerardo Budowski, (Campeón de los Extranjeros), beat Julio García, (Campeón Nacional de Venezuela) 6–0, in a match for the Campeón Absoluto de Venezuela title.

Winners

References

Chess national championships
Championship
1891 in chess
Recurring events established in 1891